Leigh Bardugo is an Israeli-American fantasy author. She is best known for her young adult Grishaverse novels, which include the Shadow and Bone trilogy, the Six of Crows duology, and the King of Scars duology. She also received acclaim for her paranormal fantasy adult debut, Ninth House. The Shadow and Bone and Six of Crows series have been adapted into Shadow and Bone by Netflix and Ninth House will be adapted by Amazon Studios; Bardugo is an executive producer on both works.

Early life
Bardugo was born in Jerusalem, Israel, in 1975 and grew up in Los Angeles, California, U.S. where she was raised by her grandparents. She is secular Jewish and of Moroccan Jewish descent on her father's side, and of Ashkenazi Jewish  (Russian-Jewish and Lithuanian-Jewish) descent on her mother's side.

She attended Yale University, graduating with a degree in English in the spring of 1997. She was a member of the Wolf's Head secret society. Before publishing her first novel, she worked in copywriting and journalism, as well as makeup and special effects.

Career
Bardugo's debut novel, Shadow and Bone, the first book in the Grisha trilogy, was published in 2012 by Macmillan. Shadow and Bone was nominated for the Romantic Times Book Award and the South Carolina Children's Book Award, named an Indie Next List Book, and reviewed in The New York Times. The novel hit #8 on The New York Times Best Seller list, and had been optioned for film by David Heyman and DreamWorks. The other books in the trilogy, Siege and Storm and Ruin and Rising, were published by Macmillan in 2013 and 2014 respectively. Bardugo defines Shadow and Bone genre as Tsarpunk - a fantasy with inspiration from early 19th century Russia.

The Six of Crows duology (Six of Crows and Crooked Kingdom) was published by Macmillan in 2015 and 2016. It is set in the same universe as the Grisha trilogy (sometimes collectively referred to as the "Grishaverse"). Six of Crows was named a New York Times Notable Book and an ALA-YALSA Top Ten Pick of 2016. The Language of Thorns, a collection of Grisha fairy tales and folk tales, was published by Macmillan in 2017.

Bardugo then wrote the first book in the DC Icons series, which are novelizations of DC Comics' biggest superheroes; her Wonder Woman: Warbringer was published by Penguin Random House in 2017.

In 2019, Bardugo's first adult novel, Ninth House, was published by Flatiron Books. It won the 2019 Goodreads Choice Award for best fantasy novel. In January 2023, she published the sequel to Ninth House, Hell Bent.

Bardugo also has essays and short stories in anthology collections such as Last Night, A Superhero Saved My Life, Slasher Girls and Monster Boys, and Summer Days and Summer Nights. Her books have been translated into 22 languages and published in over 50 countries.

Bardugo appeared on a Grishaverse panel alongside showrunner Heisserer at New York Comic Con in October 2020. She was ranked the sixth most popular author between 2016 and 2021 on Goodreads.

Adaptations

In September 2012, DreamWorks acquired the movie rights to Shadow and Bone with David Heyman and Jeffrey Clifford producing, although this project was not realized. In January 2019, Netflix ordered an eight-episode series based on the Shadow and Bone and Six of Crows book series. Bardugo made a cameo appearance in episode three of Shadow and Bone.

In October 2019, Amazon Studios announced that it would adapt Ninth House. Bardugo is set to executive produce the project alongside Pouya Shahbazian.

Personal life
In the acknowledgements section of Six of Crows, Bardugo reveals she has osteonecrosis and sometimes needs to use a cane; this was a source of inspiration for one of the story's six protagonists, master thief and gang boss Kaz Brekker, who uses a cane.

Bardugo was a singer in the band Captain Automatic from 2006 to 2007. She eloped with her partner of 4 years in January 2022.

Bibliography

The Grishaverse

Shadow and Bone trilogy
 Shadow and Bone (2012)
 Siege and Storm (2013)
 Ruin and Rising (2014)

Six of Crows duology
 Six of Crows (2015)
 Crooked Kingdom (2016)

King of Scars duology
 King of Scars (2019)
 Rule of Wolves (2021)

Companion books
 The Language of Thorns (2017)
 The Lives of Saints (2020)
 Demon in the Wood (2022)

Other titles
Alex Stern series 
 Ninth House (2019)
 Hell Bent (2023)
Standalones 
 Wonder Woman: Warbringer (2017)
Comics
 Wonder Woman: Warbringer (2020)

Essays
 "We Are Not Amazons" from Last Night a Superhero Saved My Life anthology (2016)
Short Stories 
 "The Witch of Duva" (2012)
 "The Tailor" (2013)
 "The Too-Clever Fox" (2013)
 "Little Knife" (2014)
 "The Demon in the Wood: A Darkling Prequel Story" (2015)
"Verse Chorus Verse" in Slasher Girls & Monster Boys, edited by April Genevieve Tucholke (2015)
 "Head, Scales, Tongue, and Tail" in Summer Days and Summer Nights, edited by Stephanie Perkins (2016)
 "Ayama and the Thorn Wood" (2017)
 "The Soldier Prince" (2017)
 "When Water Sang Fire" (2017)

"The Witch of Duva", "The Too-Clever Fox", and "Little Knife" were later released as a set called Folktales from Ravka in 2015. 
2017's The Language of Thorns collected all of the short stories except "The Tailor" and "The Demon in the Wood".

Critical studies and reviews of Bardugo's work
Ninth House

Awards and nominations
The awards the author has received are as follows:

Accolades

References

External links

 
 GrishaVerse

21st-century American novelists
21st-century American women writers
American people of Lithuanian-Jewish descent
American people of Russian-Jewish descent
American people of Moroccan-Jewish descent
American people of Israeli descent
American young adult novelists
American writers of Russian descent
Inkpot Award winners
Living people
Writers from Jerusalem
Women writers of young adult literature
Yale College alumni
American Sephardic Jews
Israeli Ashkenazi Jews
Israeli Sephardi Jews
Israeli Mizrahi Jews
American Ashkenazi Jews
1975 births